Michael S. "Mike" Gaul (born April 28, 1973) is a Canadian former professional ice hockey defenceman who played in the National Hockey League (NHL).

Playing career
After playing for St. Lawrence University, he was drafted in the ninth round by the Los Angeles Kings in the 1991 NHL Entry Draft.  After a few successful years in the American Hockey League (AHL) He made his National Hockey League debut in the 1998–99 season with the Colorado Avalanche.  He also played with the Columbus Blue Jackets in the 2000–01 season. Upon retiring from Professional hockey in 2004, Mike accepted a position as a senior partner at an Investment Bank Vires Capital VII where he is currently developing and overseeing a portfolio of infrastructure projects totalling over $80B.

Career statistics

Awards and honours

References

External links

1973 births
Canadian ice hockey defencemen
Colorado Avalanche players
Columbus Blue Jackets players
Hershey Bears players
HC Ambrì-Piotta players
HC Fribourg-Gottéron players
Ice hockey people from Montreal
Knoxville Cherokees players
Laval Titan players
Living people
Los Angeles Kings draft picks
Lowell Lock Monsters players
Mobile Mysticks players
People from Lachine, Quebec
Phoenix Roadrunners (IHL) players
St. Lawrence Saints men's ice hockey players
Syracuse Crunch players